The current Social Democratic People's Party or SHP was a Turkish left social-democratic political party established in 2002 by Murat Karayalçın, former Ankara Metropolitan Mayor (1989-1993) and Foreign Minister (1994-1995).

Following Karayalçın's resignation from the Republican People's Party, a number of social democrats and moderate and liberal socialists came together to establish SHP. The current SHP has most of its policies in common with a former party with the same abbreviation SHP.

In 2004 Turkish local elections SHP came forward in an alliance with the pro-Kurdish Democratic People's Party and the radical left Freedom and Solidarity Party. The party leader Murat Karayalçın also became a candidate for his former seat of Ankara Metropolitan Municipality in these elections, However, he lost to the incumbent mayor Melih Gökçek of AK Parti.

The party did not participate in the general election of 2007 to avoid fragmenting the left vote. Until then, the party held two seats in the Grand National Assembly of Turkey, two former deputies having resigned in early August 2006 from the party in, what they claimed, was a show of reaction to the lack of concern by the party management against separatist terrorism. SHP, in Congress of  March 13, 2010, Equality and Democracy Party combined with the party's name and date received were mixed.

References

External links
SHP website In Turkish only

2002 establishments in Turkey
2010 disestablishments in Turkey
Defunct social democratic parties in Turkey
Political parties disestablished in 2010
Political parties established in 2002
Secularism in Turkey